Bukaros is a semiprofessional Colombian basketball team that competes in the Copa Invitacional de Baloncesto Colombiano. Its home stadium is Vicente Diaz Romero Coliseum in Bucaramanga, which has a 4,000-person capacity.

The team is operated by the Ivan Olivares basketball school in Bucaramanga.

Titles 

1994 (as Leopardos); 2006; 2007; 2011; 2012

References

External links 
 Federación Colombiana de Baloncesto

Basketball teams in Colombia